Artificial wisdom is a software system that can demonstrate one or more qualities of being wise.

Artificial wisdom can be described as artificial intelligence reaching the top-level of decision-making when confronted with the most complex challenging situations. The term artificial wisdom is used when the "intelligence" is based on more than by chance collecting and interpreting data, but by design enriched with smart and conscience strategies that wise people would use.

The worries about the future with artificial intelligence is bend to a more positive perspective when considering computer-aided wisdom; the collaboration between artificial intelligence and contemplative neuroscience.

References

Further reading 

 
 
 
 
 

 
 
 

Artificial intelligence
Cybernetics
Formal sciences
Computational neuroscience
Emerging technologies
Unsolved problems in computer science
Computational fields of study